Human remains may refer to:

A corpse or skeleton
 A deceased human body
 A cadaver
 A skeleton

Music
 Human Remains (band), an American grindcore band
 Human Remains (Hell album), 2011
 Human Remains (Terry Allen album), 1996

Film and television
 Human Remains (film), a 1998 documentary film by Jay Rosenblatt
 Human Remains (TV series), a 2000 comedy series on BBC

See also
 Conservation and restoration of human remains